Monès Chéry (born 12 February 1981) is a Haitian former professional footballer who played as a midfielder. He debuted in the 2007 CONCACAF Gold Cup for Haiti and was also on the Haiti roster for the 2009 CONCACAF Gold Cup.

External links
 
 
 

1981 births
Living people
Haitian footballers
Association football midfielders
Haiti international footballers
2007 CONCACAF Gold Cup players
2009 CONCACAF Gold Cup players
Aiglon du Lamentin players
Ligue Haïtienne players
People from Gonaïves